Eight undertrial prisoners of Bhopal Central Jail were killed in an encounter on 31 October 2016. They had allegedly escaped from the high security prison during the night. The prisoners were suspected terrorists of the Students' Islamic Movement of India.

Police Version 
According to the Madhya Pradesh police, the undertrials had escaped from the prison using bed sheets and wooden logs, after allegedly killing a jail security guard using spoons and plates.

Staged Encounter 
Various audiotapes and videos seem to indicate that the encounter killings could be staged. Leaked police control room audio clips possibly indicate that the operation could have been staged and that there were orders from the top to kill all of the prisoners. According to the tape, police officers were angry over the killing of one of their fellow officers during the prison break. The tape also suggests that police were concerned over repeated escapes by the prisoners. It is speculated that during their last prison break a guard was killed, however this is not confirmed. A leaked low quality video seem to show an officer while shooting an injured escapee lying with fellow escapees. Senior officials praised the guards that participated in the encounter.

Responses 
The kin of the killed prisoners have come out accusing the police of staging the encounter. Zuleika Bee claimed that her brother was already threatened to be killed in a fake encounter by the jail authorities.

Pervez Alma, the lawyer of seven killed prisoners, said: "It is a fake encounter, a cold-blooded murder. It was pre-planned murder and I believe they did not escape the jail, but they were made to flee by the police".

The Shiv Sana mouth piece 'Samna' argued that the killings were justified even if it was a 'staged encounter'.

References 

2016 in India